Through out the history of Selangor Sultanate, several Sultans practiced polygamy, but per Islamic marital jurisprudence, they did not have more than four wives in the same time. However, this list only included those consorts given the official royal title.

For main consort of the Ruler of Selangor, she will given the title of Tengku Ampuan of Selangor if they have royal blood meanwhile for consorts of non-royal blood, they will titled as Tengku Permaisuri of Selangor. Both of these titles are styled Her Royal Highness (Malay, Duli Yang Maha Mulia).

The title of Che Puan Besar of Selangor is an official royal title given to the second wife of the Sultan at the time. She will styled as Her Highness (Malay, Yang Teramat Mulia).

Royal consorts of Selangor

References

See also
 Selangor
 Sultan of Selangor
 Selangor royal family
 Yang di-Pertuan Agong
 Raja Permaisuri Agong
 Tengku Permaisuri of Selangor
 Queen consort

Selangor
Malaysian royalty
Selangor